Student of the Year 2 is a 2019 Indian Hindi-language teen romantic action comedy film directed by Punit Malhotra and produced by Karan Johar's Dharma Productions. A standalone sequel to the 2012 film Student of the Year, it stars Tiger Shroff, Tara Sutaria, Ananya Panday and Aditya Seal. It marks the debuts of both Panday and Sutaria in Hindi cinema. 

Principal photography for the film began in April 2018 at Dehradun, and ended in September 2018.

Student of the Year 2 was released in on 10 May 2019. Upon its release the film was panned by critics, with criticism directed at the script, unreal situations and unrealistic depiction of Indian schools and colleges. It did an average business at the box office with a worldwide collection of 98.6 crore against its 65 crore budget.

Plot
Rohan Sachdev, a middle-class student, decides to go to the affluent St. Teresa's College after his childhood sweetheart, Mridula Chawla transfers there. The two begin a relationship when Rohan wins the college over by showing his sports skills. Rohan becomes friends with Manav Singh Randhawa, the reigning "Student of the Year", but is at odds with his sister Shreya, a popular girl who detests and insults him. One of her pranks creates a rift between Rohan and his friends from his previous school.

Rohan-Mia and Manav-Shreya are coupled up for a dance competition which the latter wins after Mia falters. Rohan finds Mia getting intimate with Manav and realizes that he had deliberately planted her to spoil Rohan's image. He is expelled when he punches Manav. Initially discouraged, he eventually comes back and challenges Manav for the Student of the Year trophy.

Rohan returns to his old school, Pishorilal, where Shreya, impressed by his sincerity, helps him make amends with his old friends. She also convinces him to join her in a national dance competition. Shreya falls in love with him as they practice. Meanwhile, Mia's attempts to win him back after Manav cheats on her, end in an argument where Shreya spills coffee over her.

During an inter-school multi-event tournament, a fight breaks out between Pishorilal and St. Teresa's students, ending in Rohan's teammate Abhishek being badly injured. At the hospital, Mia holds Rohan's hand in-front of Shreya to show that they had reconciled. She apologizes to Mia and after blessing them with happiness, she leaves. Rohan follows her and professes his love, but she refuses. 

Pishorilal manages to climb up the ranks and reach the final against St. Teresa. On the second night, Mia tries to kiss Rohan, but he refuses, saying that it was time to focus on accomplishing something. Although upset, she decides to support him and they become friends.

Before the final, he confesses his love to Shreya again, which she accepts when he tells her that Mia is just his friend. Shreya and Mia support Pishorilal in the match. Rohan helps his team fight and win the tournament, defeating St. Teresa. Rohan and Shreya embrace, while Mia leaves smiling, knowing that Rohan's dream of being the Student of the Year will now come true. Pishorilal celebrates their first-ever victory, and Rohan becomes the Student of the Year, leaving Manav upset.

Cast 
 Tiger Shroff as Rohan Sachdev, Mia and Shreya's love interest and the main protagonist
 Suyash Kapoor as 15-year old Rohan
 Madhav Dhingra as 9-year old Rohan
 Tara Sutaria as Mridula "Mia" Chawla, Rohan's childhood sweetheart, girlfriend and later ex-girlfriend
 Suhani Sethi as 15-year old Mia
 Dhanaya Madan as 9-year old Mia
 Ananya Panday as Shreya Randhawa, Rohan's love interest and Manav's younger sister
 Aditya Seal as Manav Singh Randhawa, Shreya's elder brother and the main antagonist
 Harsh Beniwal as Puggi, Rohan's best friend, student at Pishorilal
 Sahil Anand as Jeet Khurana, Dimpy's friend
 Manjot Singh as Dimple "Dimpy" Singh, Jeet's friend
 Samir Soni as Principal Gujral, Dean of St. Teresa College
 Gul Panag as Kuljeet, Coach of St. Teresa College
 Abhishek Bajaj as Abhishek, Captain of the Pishorilal team
 Manoj Pahwa as Randhir Mahipal, Coach of Pishorilal Chamandas College
 Ayesha Raza Mishra as Principal Archana Singh, Dean of Pishorilal Chamandas College
 Rajesh Kumar as Prem Narayan Sachdev, Rohan's uncle
 Manasi Joshi Roy as Rohan's aunt
 Chetan Pandit as Sukesh Singh Randhawa
 Samreen Kaur as Vandana Chawla, Mia's sister
 Will Smith in a special appearance in the song "The Jawaani Song"
 Alia Bhatt in a special appearance in the song "The Hook Up Song"
 Farah Khan as a judge (cameo appearance in the dance contest)

Production

Development 
Student of the Year 2 is a sequel to the 2012 Karan Johar-directed romantic comedy-drama Student of the Year. Shortly after the commercial success of the first film, a sequel was announced by the producers. In November 2017, a press release by Dharma Productions revealed that the sequel is slated to release in 2018; it would be directed by Punit Malhotra and star Tiger Shroff in one of the leading roles. The film was announced four years after Malhotra's previous directorial Gori Tere Pyaar Mein (2013). It was to be produced in association by Johar's Dharma Productions and Fox Star Studios. The film's announcement by the company initially conflicted with that of their another production, Dhadak (2018), which roused speculation that Ishaan Khatter would star in the film. Johar denied the news and stated that the reports were "baseless and untrue".

Casting 
The announcement did not reveal the rest of the cast; media reports speculated that either Disha Patani or Ananya Panday, daughter of Chunky Pandey, would play the leading lady opposite Shroff. In April 2018, Johar announced that the film's female leads would be Panday and Tara Sutaria, both debutantes.<ref name=":0 Prior to confirming Student of the Year 2 as her film debut, Sutaria had auditioned for the role of Princess Jasmine in Disney's Aladdin (2019), but lost it to Naomi Scott. Television actor Abhishek Bajaj and Harsh Beniwal, a YouTuber, also make their film debuts. Beniwal, in preparation for the role, put on weight and grew a beard.

Malhotra stated that the two films have unrelated storylines: "The intention of the film is not to make this a Me Too of first part, so Tiger. It's a fresh take on the subject. It's more about sports and action". He was initially supposed to work on a different film with Shroff, but two-three months before filming, they scrapped the project and wrote a new script, a sequel to Student of the Year. In response to accusations that the film raised unhealthy expectations for college life, Shroff said, "What you see here is a fun school. It's a school that you want everyone to be a part of. We wanted everyone to fall in love with it". He plays an underdog in the film, expressing, "It's like Superman has been stripped of his powers".

Samir Soni, who had previously appeared in Malhotra's I Hate Luv Storys in 2012 and since shifted to direction, returned to acting by playing a college principal, a supporting role similar to the one originally portrayed by Rishi Kapoor in Student of the Year. However, the principal in the first film identified as gay, while the one played by Soni was heterosexual and more comical. Media outlets speculated that Sidharth Malhotra, Alia Bhatt and Varun Dhawan, who had starring debut roles in the previous film, would feature in a cameo appearance for a song. In May 2019, it was revealed that Bhatt features in a special appearance for the "Hook-up" song, alongside Shroff.

As a part of Will Smith's Bucket List, Will Smith appeared in a song in the film for satisfying his wish of appearing in a Bollywood production.

Filming 
Principal photography for Student of the Year 2 began on 9 April 2018 in Dehradun. Shortly afterwards, parts of the film were shot at Rishikesh and Mussoorie as part of the schedule. Sets for the film were also erected in Film City, Mumbai. After the film's production was delayed, Sutaria's filming schedule began to clash with that of her other project Kabir Singh; she quit that film to ensure that shooting took place smoothly. In August 2018, a four-day sequence was filmed in Thailand.  Filming ended in September 2018 with the shooting of the climax sequence. Student of the Year 2 was produced on an estimated budget of 650 million, including promotion and advertising costs.

Music 

The film's soundtrack was composed by Vishal–Shekhar with lyrics written by Anvita Dutt Guptan, Kumaar and first-time collaborator Vayu, and was released under the banner of Zee Music Company. Reviewing the soundtrack, Pratishruti Ganguly of Firstpost wrote, "Unfortunately, tracks like "Hook Up Song" and "Mumbai Dilli Ki Kudiyan" perhaps indicate that the understanding of the "jawaan" [] pulse is a tad misguided in this film".

The song "Yeh Jawani Hai Deewani", originally sung by Kishore Kumar and composed by R. D. Burman for the soundtrack to the 1972 film Jawani Diwani, was recreated for the film, with vocals provided by Vishal Dadlani and Payal Dev, and was rebranded as "The Jawaani Song".

Release

Theatrical 
On 30 July 2018, a press release by Dharma Productions stated that the film's release date was postponed to 10 May 2019 due to what was speculated to be expected competition from the science fiction action film 2.0 (2018) starring Rajinikanth, Akshay Kumar and Amy Jackson.

Marketing 
The film was announced via a first look poster featuring Shroff that was released on 20 November 2017 by Johar on various social media platforms; the poster carried the release date of 23 November 2018. In April 2018, first look posters featuring Sutaria and Panday announcing the new cast members were released; this was somewhat controversial owing to the cast being children of other actors, and this furthered the long-standing accusations of Johar promoting nepotism.

Two new teaser posters were released on 10 April 2019 presenting Shroff's look as a student. Another set of posters featuring Sutaria and Panday were released on 11 April 2019. On 12 April 2019, a theatrical release poster of the film was shared by Johar on his Instagram account; 

Student of the Year 2's teaser trailer was released along with Kalank, which released on 17 April 2019. Kshamaya Daniel of Rediff.com wrote of the trailer, "While the cast and their acting looks promising enough, the storyline – not so much".

Home media 
The film was made available as VOD on Amazon Prime Video on 1 September 2019.

Reception

Box office 
In India, the film had an average opening for the first shows with an occupancy rate of 20–25%. It went on to earn  on its first day in India, becoming the fifth highest opener of the year. The film had fair growth on Saturday, earning . By next Friday, the film had a 60 percent drop as collections reached . Following a drop in collections in the second week, the film stopped screening at most theatres.

Critical response 
Student of the Year 2 released to widely negative reviews from critics. Criticism was primarily directed to the script and unreal setting of the film.

Writing for Firstpost, Anna M. M. Vetticad gave the film one and a half stars out of five: "Cliché is piled on cliché in this unoriginal screenplay". Rajeev Masand of News18 gave it two stars out of five and said, "Student of the Year 2 is both predictable, and far from original... It isn't unwatchable, it's just unnecessary."

Saibal Chatterjee of NDTV gave it one and a half stars out of five and called the film "an egregiously escapist campus-rumpus musical in which nattily attired, unbelievably idle boys and skimpily clad girls... play games that make as much sense as a camel race on an airport tarmac", adding, "There isn't a single moment in the film that could be described as passable". Shubhra Gupta of The Indian Express gave one and a half stars out of five and expressed, "This class of 2019 has predictable beats, which is to be expected in an underdog story, but that it is so stilted is disappointing: from KJo [Karan Johar] I expect much more swish and sparkle". She felt Shroff "executes his dances-and-fights efficiently, even though [he] struggles to appear student-like".

Taran Adarsh of Bollywood Hungama praised the screenplay for being "praiseworthy as its peppered with some entertaining, dramatic and even moving moments". He wrote, "On the whole, Student of the Year 2 is an entertaining and an enjoyable fare which will strike a chord in the audience's hearts". Ronak Kotecha of The Times of India gave the film three stars out of five, writing that it "doesn't have that Ishq wala love, but there is ample dosti, high school drama and cool stuff to keep you going".

Meena Iyer of Daily News and Analysis gave it three stars out of five, writing, "This is the kind of film, which draws inspiration from the Archie comics with Tiger being Archie, flanked by a Veronica (Ananya) and Betty (Tara)". She concludes, "Apart from Will Smith's miss-if-you-blink appearance, watch [the film] for Tiger. Even when things around him are caving in, his ballerina grace is intact".

Accolades

References

External links 
 
 
 

2019 films
2019 romantic comedy-drama films
2010s sports comedy-drama films
2010s Hindi-language films
Fox Star Studios films
Films set in Dehradun
Indian sports comedy-drama films
Indian romantic comedy-drama films
Films set in universities and colleges
Films shot in Uttarakhand
Films shot in Mumbai
Indian sequel films
Indian teen romance films
Films shot in Mussoorie
2019 comedy-drama films